This article is a list of television-related events during 1984.

Events

Programs
20/20 (1978–present)
60 Minutes (1968–present)
ABC's Wide World of Sports (1961–1998)
Alice (1976–1985)
All My Children (1970–2011)
American Bandstand (1952–1989)
Another World (1964–1999)
As the World Turns (1956–2010)
Battle of the Planets (1978–1985)
Benson (1979–1986)
Cagney & Lacey (1982–1988)
Candid Camera (1948–2004)
Capitol (1982–1987)
Cheers (1982–1993)
Dallas (1978–1991)
Dangermouse (1980–1992)
Days of Our Lives (1965–present)
Derrick (1974–1998)
Diff'rent Strokes (1978–1986)
Dynasty (1981–1989)
Face the Nation (1954–present)
Falcon Crest (1981–1990)
Fame (1982–1987)
Family Feud (1976–1985, 1988–1995, 1999–present)
Family Ties (1982–1989)
Fraggle Rock (1983–1987)
General Hospital (1963–present)
Gimme a Break! (1981–1987)
Good Morning America (1975–present)
Guiding Light (1952–2009)
Hallmark Hall of Fame (1951–present)
Happy Days (1974–1984)
Hart to Hart (1979–1984)
Hee Haw (1969–1993)
Hill Street Blues (1981–1987)
Inspector Gadget (1983–1986)
Knight Rider (1982–1986)
Knots Landing (1979–1993)
Late Night with David Letterman (1982–1993)
Loving (1983–1995)
Magnum, P.I. (1980–1988)
Mama's Family (1983–1985, 1986–1990)
Masterpiece Theatre (1971–present)
Match Game—Hollywood Squares Hour (1962–1969, 1973–1984, 1990–1991, 1998–1999)
Meet the Press (1947–present)
Monday Night Football (1970–present)
Moneyline (1980–present)
Mutual of Omaha's Wild Kingdom (1963–1988, 2002–present)
Newhart (1982–1990)
Nightline (1979–present)
One Life to Live (1968–2012, 2013)
Press Your Luck (1983–1986)
Professional Bowlers Tour (1962–1997)
Remington Steele (1982–1987)
Ryan's Hope (1975–1989)
Saturday Night Live (1975–present)
Scarecrow and Mrs. King (1983–1987)
Schoolhouse Rock! (1973–1986)
Search for Tomorrow (1951–1986)
Sesame Street (1969–present)
Silver Spoons (1982–1987)
Simon & Simon (1981–1988)
Solid Gold (1980–1988)
Soul Train (1971–2006)
SportsCenter (1979–present)
St. Elsewhere (1982–1988)
Star Search (1983-1995, 2003)
That's Incredible! (1980–1984)
The A-Team (1983–1987)
The Dukes of Hazzard (1979–1985)
The Edge of Night (1956–1984)
The Facts of Life (1979–1988)
The Fall Guy (1981–1986)
The Jeffersons (1975–1985)
The Love Boat (1977–1986)
The P.T.L. Club (1976–1987)
The Price Is Right (1972–present)
The Today Show (1952–present)
The Tonight Show Starring Johnny Carson (1962–1992)
The Young and the Restless (1973–present)
This Old House (1979–present)
This Week in Baseball (1977–1998, 2000–2011)
Three's Company (1977–1984)
Too Close for Comfort (1980–1986)
Trapper John, M.D. (1979–1986)
Truth or Consequences (1950–1988)
Webster (1983–1989)
Wheel of Fortune (1975–present)

Debuting this year

Resuming this year

Changing networks

Ending this year

Entering syndication

Made-for-TV movies and miniseries
V: The Final Battle

Television stations

Station launches

Network affiliation changes

Births

Deaths

See also
 1984 in the United States
 List of American films of 1984

References

External links 
List of 1984 American television series at IMDb